Riot Fest is an annual three-day punk rock music festival based in Chicago, Illinois, at Douglass Park. It is known for booking reunions, guest performances, and full album performances. Riot Fest remains one of the largest independently owned music festivals in the United States.

History 
Riot Fest was established in Chicago in 2005 by Mike Petryshyn and Sean McKeough, the latter who also co-produced Chicago's Motoblot annual motorcycle rally. Riot Fest spent seven years as a multi-venue festival, using the Metro, Subterranean, Double Door, Cobra Lounge and the Congress Theater to present bands over a three-day weekend, such as Social Distortion, Danzig, Cock Sparrer, Weezer, Alkaline Trio, the Mighty Mighty Bosstones, Bad Brains, the Dead Milkmen, Fun., the Lawrence Arms, Bad Religion, the Murder City Devils, Butthole Surfers, the Suicide Machines, and more.

Punk, rock, indie rock, alternative, psychobilly, metal, skate punk and ska are represented at Riot Fest along with reunion sets from Naked Raygun, Wax, Blue Meanies, Articles of Faith, Plow United, the Jesus and Mary Chain, Chiodos, Misfits, Jawbreaker and the Replacements.

In 2012, Riot Fest moved from various venues around the city to an outdoor venue at Chicago's Humboldt Park and was marketed as Riot Fest & Carnival, with rides, games, wrestling, and food vendors. 2012 also saw the festival expand through North America with events staged in Brooklyn, Toronto, Dallas, and Denver soon after.[4] Since the death of McKeough in 2016, Riot Fest has remained a once-a-year event in Chicago.

The festival played a key role in the reunions of Naked Raygun, The Replacements in 2013, the Misfits in 2016, and Jawbreaker in 2017, among others.

2012 
The festival consisted of two days of music at Humboldt Park on Saturday, September 15 and Sunday, September 16 and a Friday night kickoff at the Congress Theater. The lineup for Riot Fest in 2012 included:

Friday, September 14:
The Offspring, Neon Trees, Pegboy, Dead Sara

Saturday, September 15:
Rise Against, Descendents, Dropkick Murphys, Coheed and Cambria, Slapstick, the Gaslight Anthem, Minus the Bear, Andrew W.K., Hot Water Music, August Burns Red, Gwar, Frank Turner, the Adicts, Cursive, Nobunny, Of Mice & Men, Deals Gone Bad, A Wilhelm Scream, Teenage Bottlerocket, Larry and His Flask, Off With Their Heads, the Story So Far, Fireworks, Droids Attack, Environmental Encroachment

Sunday, September 16:
Iggy and the Stooges, Gogol Bordello, Alkaline Trio, A Day to Remember, Elvis Costello & the Imposters, the Jesus and Mary Chain, NOFX, Awolnation, Built To Spill, Chiodos, the Promise Ring, Less Than Jake, Fishbone, the Reverend Horton Heat, Imagine Dragons, the Henry Clay People, Blackbox, Screaming Females, White Mystery, Sister Crayon, Japanther, the Infected, Battle Royal Winner, Environmental Encroachment

2013 
Riot Fest & Carnival returned to Humboldt Park in Chicago in 2013 and included satellite festivals in Toronto (August 24–25) and Denver (September 21–22). The 2013 festival was noted for being the first performance by reunited punk legends the Replacements and notably the first performance by the band in Chicago since their very public breakup onstage at the Taste of Chicago in 1991. The 2013 Chicago lineup included:

Friday, September 13:
Fall Out Boy, Sublime with Rome, Danzig with Doyle, Joan Jett & the Blackhearts, Bad Religion, Atmosphere, Yellowcard, Screeching Weasel, Andrew W.K., Gwar, Hatebreed, Smoking Popes, Dessa, Saul Williams, the Flatliners, Masked Intruder, Flatfoot 56, Environmental Encroachment

Saturday, September 14:
Blink-182, Violent Femmes, Rancid, Blondie, Public Enemy, FLAG, Guided by Voices, Taking Back Sunday, Dinosaur Jr., X, DeVotchKa, Pennywise, Best Coast, the Lawrence Arms, Glassjaw, the Devil Wears Prada, the Selecter, T.S.O.L., Stars, the Dear Hunter, Surfer Blood, the Interrupters, Empires, New Beat Fund, Radkey, Mephiskapheles, Kitten, Environmental Encroachment

Sunday, September 15:
The Replacements, Pixies, AFI, Brand New, All Time Low, Pierce the Veil, Rocket from the Crypt, the Dismemberment Plan, the Broadways, Against Me!, Bob Mould, the Lillingtons, Suicidal Tendencies, Quicksand, Bad Books, Mission of Burma, Saves the Day, Bayside, Peter Hook and the Light, Reggie and the Full Effect, the Wonder Years, Maps & Atlases, Chuck Ragan, Memphis May Fire, Peelander-Z, Touché Amoré, Off with Their Heads, Deal's Gone Bad, Twin Peaks, White Mystery, Direct Hit!, Pet Symmetry, Hostage Calm, Environmental Encroachment

2014 
In September 2014 Riot Festival & Carnival returned to Humboldt Park for the last time. Roberto Maldonado, who had been a supporter of Riot Fest in the past, stated he would not have the fest back for 2015. This was due to damages to the park after heavy rain during the festival. The repairs cost $150,000.

Riot Fest 2014 included the inaugural "Riot Fest Speaks" panel, moderated by Henry Rollins and featuring Pussy Riot members Nadya Tolokonnikova and Masha Alyokhina, Bad Religion vocalist and UCLA professor Greg Graffin, Rise Against vocalist Tim McIlrath, writer/activist Marcelle Karp, and Riot Fest founder Michael Petryshyn. In addition, 2014 saw the return of Riot Fest in Denver and Toronto.

The 2014 Chicago lineup included:

Friday, September 12: Jane's Addiction (performing Nothing's Shocking), Rise Against, Slayer (performing Reign in Blood), the Offspring (performing Smash), NOFX (performing Punk in Drublic), Gogol Bordello, Of Mice & Men, Mastodon, the Murder City Devils, Failure, Circa Survive, Clutch, GWAR, Stiff Little Fingers, Black Joe Lewis & the Honeybears, We Came as Romans, Senses Fail (performing Let It Enfold You), All, Title Fight, Emarosa, Pity Sex, From Indian Lakes, the Hotelier, Radkey, Pianos Become the Teeth, Red City Radio, Baby Baby, Wounds, Plague Vendor, Somos, ¡Vamos!

Saturday, September 13: the National, the Flaming Lips, Wu-Tang Clan, Samhain (performing Initium), Descendents (performing Milo Goes to College), Metric, Taking Back Sunday, Die Antwoord, City and Colour, Paul Weller, the Used, the Afghan Whigs, Cock Sparrer, Dashboard Confessional, Television, Saosin, Say Anything, the Mighty Mighty Bosstones, Tokyo Police Club, the Dandy Warhols, the Get Up Kids (performing Something to Write Home About), Me First and the Gimme Gimmes, Streetlight Manifesto, Buzzcocks, Face to Face, Wavves, the Orwells, Rx Bandits, Samiam, 7 Seconds, Anti-Flag, FrnkIero and the Cellabration, Citizen, the World Is a Beautiful Place & I Am No Longer Afraid to Die, Lemuria, the Pizza Underground, Nostalghia, Skaters, the Unlikely Candidates, Jessica Hernandez & the Deltas, the Bots, Broncho, the American Scene, Restorations, the Picturebooks, Rose's Pawn Shop, the Crombies, Ex Friends, Daniel Wade, Buffalo Rodeo

Sunday, September 14: the Cure (performing Disintegration), Weezer (performing The Blue Album), Social Distortion, Primus, Tegan and Sara, Cheap Trick (performing Heaven Tonight), Patti Smith, Bring Me the Horizon, Dropkick Murphys, Naked Raygun (performing Throb Throb), Superchunk, Billy Bragg, the Hold Steady, Blue Meanies, Lucero, New Found Glory, Mudhoney, Hot Snakes, Motion City Soundtrack, Andrew W.K. (performing I Get Wet), the Bouncing Souls, Kurt Vile & the Violators, Mineral, La Dispute, Only Crime, the Menzingers, the Front Bottoms, Silverstein, the Whigs, In the Valley Below, Modern Baseball, I Am the Avalanche, Laura Stevenson, Cerebral Ballzy, Pup, Dads, ShowYouSuck, Lucki Eck$, My Gold Mask, Tiny Moving Parts, Team Spirit, Survay Says!, Chumped, Archie Powell & the Exports, Netherfriends, Mutts, the Grizzled Mighty

2015 
Conflicts over the condition of the grass and negative effects on the Boricua community, including gentrification of Humboldt Park and lack of financial benefits to the residents of the area led to the festival being moved to Douglass Park. After settling on the new location, Saint Anthony Hospital filed a lawsuit against Riot Fest on September 4, arguing that the festival would be detrimental to their patients' health because of the "extreme noise" and the heavy traffic that would surround the hospital. The two sides reached an agreement which included "restoring parking on 19th Street in front of Saint Anthony Hospital, building pedestrian barricades on the west side of California Avenue and sound monitoring within the hospital to protect patients."

The 2015 Chicago lineup included:

Friday, September 11: No Doubt, Faith No More, Motörhead, Ice Cube with DJ Yella and MC Ren, Alkaline Trio, Coheed and Cambria, Flogging Molly, Slightly Stoopid, Thrice, Dirty Heads, Anthrax, Eagles of Death Metal, Against Me!, Bayside, Mest, Atreyu, Lee "Scratch" Perry, the Expendables, Living Colour, Fishbone, Death, Mariachi El Bronx, CIV, Every Time I Die, Real Friends, 88 Fingers Louie, Mustard Plug, Into It. Over It., Post Malone With FKi, Chef'Special, Barb Wire Dolls, the Coathangers, Prayers, Speedy Ortiz, White Mystery, Ground Up, Skinny Lister, Alex Wiley, Heems, Psalm One, Dreamers, Faulkner

Saturday, September 12: System of a Down, Iggy Pop, Rancid (performing ...And Out Come the Wolves), Billy Idol, Taking Back Sunday, Drive Like Jehu, Merle Haggard, Alexisonfire, the Academy Is... (performing Almost Here), the Lawrence Arms, Echo & the Bunnymen, Bootsy Collins' Rubber Band, the Damned, Pennywise, the Devil Wears Prada, Mayday Parade, Babes in Toyland, Desaparecidos, the Joy Formidable, the Dead Milkmen, FIDLAR, Millencolin, American Nightmare, Swervedriver, Gwar, Lifetime, Joyce Manor, the Movielife, Steve Ignorant and Paranoid Visions, the Dear Hunter, the Ataris (performing Blue Skies, Broken Hearts...Next 12 Exits), Modern Life Is War (performing Witness), Fit for Rivals, Flatfoot 56, Teenage Bottlerocket, Chon, Counterpunch, Direct Hit!, Dirty Fences, Sleep On It, the Brokedowns, Meat Wave, Elway, Indian Handcrafts, Pears, Clowns

Saturday also saw the return of the "Riot Fest Speaks" panel series, once again moderated by Henry Rollins. The panel featured Damien Echols and Jason Baldwin of the West Memphis Three, discussing their history and the contribution of music activism to their release from prison. They were joined for the panel by Thurston Moore and former Crass vocalist Steve Ignorant.

Sunday, September 13: Modest Mouse, the Prodigy, Snoop Dogg, Damian "Jr. Gong" Marley, Tenacious D, Rodrigo Y Gabriela, L7, Stephen "Ragga" Marley, Kongos, Cypress Hill, Yelawolf, the Airborne Toxic Event, Manchester Orchestra, De La Soul, Andrew McMahon in the Wilderness, New Politics, Jimmy Cliff, Andrew W.K., Less Than Jake, the Thurston Moore Band, Morgan Heritage, Doomtree, Hum, Tarrus Riley, the Dwarves, Tommy Stinson, Kevin Devine, Jo Mersa, Alvvays, the White Buffalo, Black-Am-I, Skip Marley, Knuckle Puck, Jazz Cartier, Have Mercy, Superheaven, Foxing, Beach Slang, Cayetana, Blis, Northern Faces, Souvenirs, Skating Polly, Signals Midwest, Modern Chemistry, Tashsa the Amazon, Foxtrott, Twin River, Indian School

Sunday also featured an additional "Riot Fest Speaks" panel, entitled Basement Screams, on Chicago's independent and punk scenes. The panel was moderated by Metro Chicago owner/founder Joe Shanahan and included Rise Against bassist Joe Principe, Naked Raygun lead vocalist Jeff Pezzati, the Lawrence Arms bassist/vocalist Brendan Kelly, Bloodshot Records founder Nan Warshaw, the Bollweevils vocalist Daryl Wilson, and Oz owner Dem Hopkins. Sunday also included a performance by "punk poet" John Cooper Clarke and a surprise side stage performance from Taking Back Sunday

2016
On May 12, 2016, it was announced that after 33 years, the Misfits lineup of Glenn Danzig, Jerry Only and Doyle Wolfgang von Frankenstein would reunite and headline the Riot Fest in Chicago and Denver in September 2016.

The Chicago lineup included:

Friday, September 16: the Flaming Lips, Ween, Julian Marley (performing Bob Marley and the Wailers' Exodus), the Specials, Jimmy Eat World, NOFX, Refused, Pierce the Veil, All Time Low, Glassjaw, Pepper, Meat Puppets, Dan Deacon, Gwar, the Anniversary, Set Your Goals, Neck Deep, Highly Suspect, Fu Manchu, Girls Against Boys, the Dillinger Escape Plan, Tigers Jaw, Basement, Touché Amoré, Diarrhea Planet, Big D and the Kids Table, Citizen, Turnover, Violent Soho, Off with Their Heads, Holy White Hounds, Laura Stevenson, Somos, 3Teeth, the Wans, Jule Vera, Worriers, Eskimeaux, the Far East, Bad Cop/Bad Cop, Stellar West

Saturday, September 17: Morrissey, Death Cab for Cutie, Social Distortion (performing White Light, White Heat, White Trash), Nas, Brand New, Fitz and the Tantrums, Descendents, Motion City Soundtrack, the Hives, Bob Mould, the Hold Steady (performing Boys and Girls in America), Method Man & Redman, GZA, Smoking Popes, the Vandals, Fucked Up, I the Mighty, the Toasters, Hippo Campus, Balance and Composure, People Under the Stairs, White Lung, Jessica Hernandez & the Deltas, Dee-1, Brick + Mortar, Night Riots, Plague Vendor, Microwave, Death Spells, Deal's Gone Bad, Black Foxxes, the Walters, Nots, Donna Missal, Tasha the Amazon, Blackbox, High Waisted, Summer Cannibals, Partner, Kitten Forever, Sleepy Kitty, School of Rock

Sunday, September 18: Misfits, Rob Zombie (performing White Zombie's Astro-Creep 2000), Sleater-Kinney, Deftones, Bad Religion, Underoath, Thursday, Jake Bugg, Death Grips, the Julie Ruin, Joey Badass, Chevy Metal, Me First and the Gimme Gimmes, Tiger Army, the Wonder Years, Dee Snider, Andrew W.K., Leftöver Crack, Billy Talent, the Falcon, Juliette and the Licks, frnkiero andthe patience, the Bronx, Pouya, Swingin' Utters, Denzel Curry, Bleached, Creeper, Tancred, Marina City, Syd Arthur, the Dirty Nil, the So So Glos, Big Ups, All Dogs, War on Women, Hard Girls, A Will Away, Can't Swim, With Our Arms to the Sun, the Gallow Walkers, School of Rock

2017
On March 17, 2017, Riot Fest announced that the festival would not return to Denver, citing the death of co-founder Sean Mckeough the previous November as making it impossible to focus on more than one event in 2017. Despite this, the festival has expressed interest in eventually returning to Denver.  In April 2017, it was announced that Jawbreaker was reuniting after 21 years and playing Riot Fest 2017.

The Chicago lineup included:

Friday, September 15: Nine Inch Nails, New Order, A Day to Remember, Dirty Heads, Vic Mensa, Ministry, Death from Above, Action Bronson, X, Mayday Parade (performing A Lesson in Romantics), the Cribs, Liars, Buzzcocks, the Story So Far, State Champs, Four Year Strong, INVSN, Chon, the Hotelier, Saul Williams, Nothing More, Radar State, Tobacco, Seaway, Like Pacific, Sleep On It, Grayscale, Skating Polly, Warm Brew, and Hdbeendope

Saturday, September 16: Queens of the Stone Age, Wu-Tang Clan (performing Enter the Wu-Tang (36 Chambers)), Mike D (DJ Set), At the Drive-In, Danzig (performing Danzig III), Gogol Bordello, Taking Back Sunday, New Found Glory, FIDLAR, Bad Brains, Peaches, the Lawrence Arms (performing Oh! Calcutta!), Bayside (performing the Walking Wounded), Dead Cross, Streetlight Manifesto, GBH, Shabazz Palaces, Fishbone (performing Truth and Soul), Knuckle Puck, Black Pistol Fire, Slaves, Versus, RVIVR, the Smith Street Band, Potty Mouth, the Regrettes, Cold Beat, Turnspit, and Gin Rummy

Sunday, September 17: Jawbreaker, Paramore, Prophets of Rage, M.I.A., TV on the Radio, Dinosaur Jr. (performing You're Living All Over Me), Pennywise, Built to Spill (performing Keep It Like a Secret), the Mighty Mighty Bosstones (performing Let's Face It), the Orwells, Best Coast, Cap'n Jazz, Minus the Bear, Say Anything, the Menzingers, GWAR, Hot Water Music, Real Friends, Andrew W.K., Beach Slang, that dog. (performing Retreat from the Sun), Mad Caddies, the Flatliners, Dessa, the Voluptuous Horror of Karen Black, Engine 88, Downtown Boys, Culture Abuse, Gazebos, Kitten Forever, and Upset

2018
Riot Fest was again held in Douglass Park in Chicago, September 14–16. Behind the scenes issues led to the finalized lineup and schedule not being released until the week before the fest, leading many to assume the 2018 version would be the third iteration to be canceled. Blink-182 was originally set to headline the first night but dropped out after drummer Travis Barker was hospitalized for blood clots in his arms. The band was replaced with Weezer and Run the Jewels, and would ultimately be booked the next year.

The lineup included

Friday, September 14: Weezer, Taking Back Sunday, Young the Giant, Dropkick Murphys, Bleachers, Atmosphere, Flogging Molly, Cypress Hill (performing Black Sunday), Matt and Kim, Sum 41, the Front Bottoms, K.Flay, Digable Planets (performing Reachin' (A New Refutation of Time and Space)), Liz Phair, Lagwagon (performing Let's Talk About Feelings), Pussy Riot, the Aquabats, Hobo Johnson & the Lovemakers, Face to Face, Arkells, Flor, Speedy Ortiz, Fever 333, Direct Hit!, the Bombpops, Archie Powell & the Exports, Typesetter, Blood People

Saturday, September 15: Beck, Elvis Costello & the Imposters, Interpol, Jerry Lee Lewis, the Jesus Lizard, the Voidz, Twin Peaks, Cat Power, Gary Numan, Killing Joke, Wolfmother, Reignwolf, Andrew W.K., GWAR, Conflict, Piebald, Adolescents, Cobra Skulls, HEALTH, the Frights, the Districts, Bully, Street Dogs, Lower Class Brats, Total Chaos, Mannequin Pussy, Badflower, Beach Bunny

Sunday, September 16: Run the Jewels, Incubus, Blondie, Alkaline Trio, Father John Misty, Bad Religion (performing Suffer), UnderØath, Suicidal Tendencies (performing Suicidal Tendencies), Bullet for My Valentine, Clutch, the Wonder Years, SWMRS, Johnny Marr, Superchunk, JD McPherson, Fear (performing The Record), the Bouncing Souls, Dillinger Four, Avengers, Calpurnia, Kevin Devine, the Audition, Spitalfield (performing Remember Right Now), the Dangerous Summer, Mom Jeans., Beach Rats, pronoun, Beach Goons, Just Friends, Save Face, Super Whatevr, No Small Children

2019
Douglass Park, Chicago, Illinois, September 13–15, 2019. This year marked the 15th anniversary of the festival.

Friday, September 13: Blink-182 (performing Enema of the State), The Flaming Lips (performing Yoshimi Battles the Pink Robots), Jawbreaker, Rancid, Violent Femmes, Descendents, Dashboard Confessional (performing The Places You Have Come to Fear the Most), Pennywise, Cock Sparrer, Neck Deep, Lucero, Senses Fail (performing From the Depths of Dreams), Glassjaw (performing Worship and Tribute), The Get Up Kids, Hot Water Music, Anti-Flag, H2O, Hot Mulligan, I Don't Know How But They Found Me, Caroline Rose, Mat Kerekes, Angel Dust, The Garden, Pkew Pkew Pkew, Pink Fly, No Parents, Thin Lips, Yours Truly, Can't Swim

Saturday, September 14: Slayer (Final Chicago and Milwaukee Performance), Rise Against, Bloc Party (performing Silent Alarm), Wu-Tang Clan, Manchester Orchestra, The Story So Far, Avail (performing Over the James), The Struts, PVRIS, Anthrax, Testament, Andrew W.K., GWAR, Turnover, Senses Fail (performing Let It Enfold You), The Selecter (performing Too Much Pressure), The Damned Things, Grandson, Turnstile, Surfer Blood, Cursive, The Hu, Prof, Cherry Glazerr, Masked Intruder, Drakulas, Microwave, Lando Chill, Cleopatrick, Elder Brother, Monarchy Over Monday

Sunday, September 15: Bikini Kill, The Raconteurs, Ween (performing The Mollusk), Patti Smith and Her Band, Taking Back Sunday (performing Tell All Your Friends and Louder Now), The B-52's, Against Me! (performing Reinventing Axl Rose and Transgender Dysphoria Blues), The Starting Line, Streetlight Manifesto, Bob Mould, American Football, Village People, Ride, Guided By Voices, Less Than Jake, Nick Lowe, Frank Iero, Save Ferris, The Ergs!, White Reaper, Teenage Bottlerocket, Dave Hause and the Mermaid, This Wild Life, Dead Swords, The Beaches, Sincere Engineer, Skating Polly, Ultra Q, Kali Masi, Ganser, Ramona

2021 
Riot Fest was held in Douglass Park, Chicago, Illinois, on September 17–19 with a preview party on the 16th.

My Chemical Romance was initially announced in January 2020 as the headliner for Riot Fest 2020. The event was then postponed in June 2020 due to COVID-19.

On April 16, 2021, My Chemical Romance announced the postponement of all shows until 2022. In response, Riot Fest confirmed the 2021 edition of the festival was still happening and shared a letter from founder Mike Petryshyn stating their intent to announce new headliners and a complete lineup in May 2021.

On August 19, 2021, Nine Inch Nails announced the cancellation of their 2021 dates. In response, Riot Fest booked Slipknot as a new headliner, and added a special 'preview party' on the 16th with Morrissey. Later, the Pixies also canceled their 2021 tour dates, with which on September 2, Riot Fest added The Flaming Lips on Sunday with Slipknot, and on the 16th added Alkaline Trio, Patti Smith, Joyce Manor and more. Around the same time, Dinosaur Jr. also canceled their dates until November, with Riot Fest adding Pinegrove soon after.

On September 14, both Faith No More and Mr. Bungle also announced the cancellation of each band's fall 2021 dates, including Riot Fest, citing vocalist Mike Patton's ongoing mental health issues. Riot Fest organizers booked Rise Against and Anthrax as replacements for both bands.

Thursday, September 16 (Preview Party): Morrissey, Alkaline Trio, Patti Smith and Her Band, Joyce Manor (performing S/T), WDRL, Kristeen Young

Friday, September 17: The Smashing Pumpkins, Coheed and Cambria, Lupe Fiasco (performing The Cool), NOFX, Dirty Heads, Sublime with Rome, Circle Jerks, Motion City Soundtrack, Thrice, Circa Survive, Pinegrove, Meg Myers, The Lawrence Arms, Beach Bunny, Anti-Flag, Living Colour, Fishbone (performing The Reality of My Surroundings), Envy On the Coast, the Sounds, Amigo the Devil, Eyedress, Beach Goons, Meet Me at the Altar, Seratones, Radkey, Kississippi, Jackie Hayes, Oxymorrons, Girl Puppy, Senor Kino

Saturday, September 18: Run the Jewels, Rise Against, Dropkick Murphys, Rancid, Taking Back Sunday, Vic Mensa, Gogol Bordello, Mayday Parade, Bayside, State Champs, The Mighty Mighty Bosstones, Andrew W.K., Best Coast, Big Freedia, GWAR, Hepcat, The Bronx, Les Savy Fav, Four Year Strong, Citizen, Fucked Up, Joywave, Night Moves, Man On Man, The Bollweevils, Action/Adventure, Ganser, Just Friends, The Orphan the Poet, Bearings, Spider, Devon Kay & The Solutions

Sunday, September 19: Slipknot, Machine Gun Kelly, The Flaming Lips, DEVO, New Found Glory, Simple Plan, Anthrax, The Ghost Inside, Body Count, Thursday, K.Flay, Knuckle Puck, HEALTH, The Bled, Mother Mother, 3OH!3, Alex G, Fever 333, KennyHoopla, Bleached, The Gories, Facs, Ratboys, Blackstarkids, The Clockworks, Pet Symmetry, Melkbelly, Gymshorts, The Weak Days, Airstream Futures

2022
Riot Fest was held in Douglass Park, Chicago, Illinois, on Friday, September 16 – Sunday, September 18.

The festival's 2022 lineup was announced on May 11th.  Placebo was initially announced to be playing on Friday, September 16th, but had to withdraw from the festival when their planned North American tour was postponed due to visa and logistical issues. Bauhaus was scheduled to play on Saturday, September 17th, but canceled their planned 2022 tour when lead singer Peter Murphy entered rehab. Placebo and Bauhaus were replaced in the lineup by Sparta and Gogol Bordello, respectively. 

Friday, September 16th: My Chemical Romance, Alkaline Trio, Portugal. The Man, Bleachers, Taking Back Sunday, Descendents, Rocket From the Crypt (performing Group Sounds), The Wonder Years, Jeff Rosenstock, Anberlin, Sparta, Marky Ramone's Blitzkrieg, Lucky Boys Confusion, Hot Mulligan, Foxy Shazam, Boston Manor, Sincere Engineer, Pale Waves, Cloud Nothings, LS Dunes, carolesdaughter, Destroy Boys, AViVa, Bob Vylan, Holy Fawn, Algiers, Wargasm (UK), Cliffdiver, Sitting On Stacy

Saturday, September 17th: The Original Misfits (performing Walk Among Us), Yellowcard (performing Ocean Avenue), Sunny Day Real Estate, Bad Religion, Yungblud, The Story So Far, The Front Bottoms, The Menzingers (performing On the Impossible Past), Alexisonfire, Movements, jxdn, Gogol Bordello, The Get Up Kids (performing Four Minute Mile), GWAR, 7 Seconds, Madball, Fear (performing The Record), Bully, The Joy Formidable, Together Pangea, Poorstacy, Mannequin Pussy, War on Women, Mothica, Charlotte Sands, Jake Hill, Bridge City Sinners, THICK, Skating Polly, No Trigger, Surfbort, cumgirl8

Sunday, September 18th: Nine Inch Nails, Yeah Yeah Yeahs, Ice Cube, Sleater-Kinney, Jimmy Eat World, The Academy Is..., Action Bronson, Lunachicks, The Maine, Midtown, PVRIS, Jawbox, Less Than Jake, Alice Glass, Coolio, The Linda Lindas, Poliça, Zola Jesus, Mom Jeans., Real Friends, The Juliana Theory, Josh A, renforshort, Joey Valence & Brae, Weathers, Kid Sistr, Save Face, The Bombpops, Treaty of Paris, Concrete Castles, Chastity, Reece Young, Moon Kissed, Night Spice, DJ Livia

Cancellations 
Three instances of Riot Fest have been canceled over the course of the festival's run.

The first came in 2009 in the form of Riot Fest West, originally set to happen in November 2009 and postponed in September. The fest initially vowed to make up the dates in spring 2010 but the replacement fest did not materialize.

The second cancellation came in 2012 when Riot Fest East in Philadelphia was again postponed, this time one week before the show's planned July 19 start date. Though a reschedule was initially promised a follow-up never emerged.

The third cancellation came in 2020 when concerns due to the COVID-19 pandemic made the festival's cancellation inevitable. Organizers have called this a postponement, as a significant part of the 2020 lineup played in the 2021 festival.

Though not an outright cancellation, Riot Fest Brooklyn in 2012 was shut down early due to weather concerns.

See also

References

External links

 
 
 
 

 

Punk rock festivals
Rock festivals in the United States
Music festivals in Chicago